The 2022 CECAFA U17 Championship was the 5th CECAFA U-17 Championship organized by CECAFA (Council of East and Central Africa Football Association). It took place from October 3 to October 15, 2022  in Addis Ababa, Ethiopia .

This competition also served as the CECAFA qualifiers for the 2023 Africa U-17 Cup of Nations as the two finalists of the tournament represented CECAFA in the CAF U-17 continental competition.

The ten teams were initially drawn into two groups of five teams. Ethiopia, Tanzania, Somalia, South Sudan and Eritrea were drawn into Group A and Uganda, Djibouti, Sudan, Burundi and Rwanda were drawn into Group B. However, on 26 September, Eritrea and Rwanda withdrew from the competition, leaving both the groups with four teams. On 1 October, Djibouti and Sudan were disqualified from the tournament after some of their players failed the MRI test, leaving Group B with only two teams. The winners and the runners-up of each group advanced to the semi-finals.

Venue

Abebe Bikila Stadium, Addis Ababa - Ethiopia

Teams

 
 - Withdrew
 - Withdrew*
 (Hosts)
 - Withdrew* 
 
 
 - Withdrew

Match officials

Referees
 Diaffari Nduwumana  (Burundi) 
 Ahmed Arajiga (Tanzania)
 Abdelaziz Yasser Ahmed(Sudan)
  Mitiku Tewodros (Ethiopia)
  Nasser Mohamud Hussein(Djibouti)
Ahmed Hassan Hussein (Somalia)
 (Ms) Jelly Chavani
 Shamirah Nabadda (Uganda)
Mahmoud Ahmed Nagi Musa  
Kassim Abdelsalam           

Assistant Referees
  Renovat Bizumuremyi (Burundi)  
 Mohamed Abdelgabar (Sudan)   
 Elmoiz Ali Mohamed Ahmed (Sudan)   
 Gasim Mader  (South Sudan)
 Adam Ali Eid (Somalia)
 Tigle Belachew (Ethiopia)
 Fasika Yehualashet Biru   (Ethiopia)
 Seif Kassim Mpanga (Tanzania) 
  Ronald Katenya (Uganda) 
 Mohamed Charmarke

Group stage
Original Groups
Group A

Group B

On  october 1st the CECAFA announced the disqualification of Sudan and  Djibouti. A new  draw was set for 2 October  with on 6 team .

Group A

Group B

Knockout stage

In the knockout stages, if a match is level at the end of normal playing time, extra time is played (two periods of 15 minutes each) and followed, if necessary, by a penalty shoot-out to determine the winners.

Semi-finals
Winners qualified for 2023 Africa U-17 Cup of Nations.

Third place

Final

Goalscorers

Qualification for CAF U17 Cup of Nations
The two finalists of the tournament qualified for the 2023 Africa U-17 Cup of Nations.

References

CECAFA competitions
2022 in African football